Ratanaporn Padunglerd (Thai:รัตนาภรณ์ ผดุงเลิศ, born 14 March 1990) is a Thai cricketer. She played for the Thailand women's national cricket team in the 2017 Women's Cricket World Cup Qualifier in February 2017. In June 2018, she was named in Thailand's squad for the 2018 ICC Women's World Twenty20 Qualifier tournament. She made her Women's Twenty20 International (WT20I) debut for Thailand on 3 June 2018, in the 2018 Women's Twenty20 Asia Cup.

In August 2019, she was named in Thailand's squad for the 2019 ICC Women's World Twenty20 Qualifier tournament in Scotland. In January 2020, she was named in Thailand's squad for the 2020 ICC Women's T20 World Cup in Australia.

References

External links

 

1990 births
Living people
Ratanaporn Padunglerd
Ratanaporn Padunglerd
Ratanaporn Padunglerd
Cricketers at the 2010 Asian Games
Cricketers at the 2014 Asian Games
Ratanaporn Padunglerd
Southeast Asian Games medalists in cricket
Competitors at the 2017 Southeast Asian Games
Ratanaporn Padunglerd